Katmundu is a 2015 Indian Bengali comedy romantic thriller film directed by Raj Chakraborty. The film features Soham Chakraborty, Abir Chatterjee, Rudranil Ghosh, Srabanti Chatterjee, Mimi Chakraborty and Saswata Chatterjee in the lead roles. The film is produced by Shyam Sundar Dey under GreenTouch Entertainment. The film was released on 16 October 2015. The story, penned down by Padmanava Dasgupta, is about three software engineers who undertake a journey to Nepal to escape the stress of a 9-to-5 job and how their life takes an unexpected turn after meeting three girls on their way, forms the crux of the story.

Cast
 Soham Chakraborty as Sunny Ghosh 
 Abir Chatterjee as Pablo Bose
 Rudranil Ghosh as Siddharth Sikdar / Sidhu
 Srabanti Chatterjee as Pallabi
 Mimi Chakraborty as Rai
 Saswata Chatterjee as Aiyoswami
 Roja Paromita Dey as Kanchi
 Malobika Banerjee as Minakshi
 Ekavali Khanna
 Sanjit Mahato

Production
The film went on the floors from 5 November 2014. Mimi Chakraborty has been cast as Soham Chakraborty’s girlfriend, Srabanti Chatterjee as Abir Chatterjee's girlfriend while Rudranil Ghosh plays other pivotal role. Saswata Chatterjee plays the boss of the office in which the male protagonists work. Model Roja Dey, who debuted on the silver screen with this film, will play the role of a Nepali. The music is given by Anupam Roy, while Sirsha Ray has been roped in as the DoP. Parts of the film has been canned in Darjeeling, Sikkim and Kolkata.

Soundtrack
The soundtrack of the film, which is composed & written by Anupam Roy, has six tracks. Nabarun Bose, keyboard player and programmer of The Anupam Roy Band, debuted as a playback singer with this film. The soundtrack of the film was released in Kolkata on 25 September 2015 in the presence of the cast and crew.

Critical reception
Zinia Sen of The Times of India reviewed "All the actors add to the revelry that this hilarious script by Padmanabha Dasgupta ensures. There are smart lines too many, and most work despite the heavy sexual undertones. But the narrative is not entirely devoid of glitches. The beautiful sunkissed pre-quake Nepal comes alive with Sirsha Ray's deft handling of the camera and some euphoric un-Anupam Roy numbers by Anupam Roy. The opening scene leaves a mark and sets the tone for the laughathon ahead. In the end, as Raj Chakrabarty chooses north over south, we don't really give a damn. It's cinema, both smart and with a heart."

Sequel
Buoyed by the success of Katmundu, director Raj Chakraborty is planning a sequel. And if all goes according to plan, Katmundu 2 should see the light of day next Puja.

Box office: Katmundu film's budget was 4 crore Rs & it crosses 4.5c Rs in 28 days.

References

Bengali-language Indian films
2010s Bengali-language films
2015 films
Films directed by Raj Chakraborty
Films scored by Anupam Roy